Rabbi Dr. Tzvi Hersh Weinreb (born 1940) is an ordained rabbi, a qualified psychotherapist and the Executive Vice President Emeritus of the Orthodox Union, the largest Orthodox Jewish organisation in North America; a position he has held since 2002. Rabbi Dr. Weinreb serves as the Editor-in-Chief of the Koren Talmud Bavli with commentary by Rabbi Adin Steinsaltz.

Rabbinic ordination and education
He received his rabbinic ordination from the Rabbi Jacob Joseph Yeshiva in New York. He received his master's degree in Psychology from the New School for Social Research, and earned his PhD from the University of Maryland. For 13 years he was the rabbi at Congregation Shomrei Emunah in Baltimore.  He served on the Rabbinic Cabinet of United Jewish Communities, on the Executive Committee of the Rabbinical Council of America, and on the boards of various other organizational and educational institutions.

Interaction with the Lubavitcher Rebbe
In what Weinreb calls a "life changing phone call", the Lubavitcher Rebbe, Rabbi Menachem Mendel Schneerson, responded to Weinreb's (anonymous) request for advice at a critical point in his life, that he consult with "A Jew in Maryland, whose name is Weinreb". Upon revealing to Rabbi Schneerson that he himself was Rabbi Weinreb, the Rebbe replied that "sometimes one must consult with oneself".
This piece of advice was regarded by Weinreb as highly invigorating and empowering.

Scholar on domestic violence
Rabbi Weinreb is a widely regarded scholar on the subject of domestic violence which helped contributed to his appointment following the Rabbi Baruch Lanner debacle.

Leader of the Orthodox Union
Although the presidency of the OU is a leadership position, Rabbi Weinreb acted as the official chief executive officer of the organization.

Possible resignation
In early 2007 it was announced that he was to step down from his position, however in an interview with The Forward he made it clear that this was not of his own choice, and following pressure he was asked to retain his position until 2009.

In 2009, Rabbi Weinreb was named Executive-Vice President, Emeritus and Rabbi Steven Weil was named as his successor.  In July 2009, Rabbi Weil transitioned in and assumed the position of Executive Vice President.

Trip to Israel
During a fact-finding mission to Israel, he came under armed fire in Sderot in May 2007.

Views

Centrism
He is considered an Orthodox centrist.

Interfaith
In 2005, he noted with great sadness the passing of Pope John Paul II.

References

External links
 Biography of Weinreb at the OU website
 Haaretz profile on Weinreb
 Comment article by Weinreb in the Jerusalem Post
 Comment article for Israel National News by Weinreb

1940 births
American Orthodox rabbis
Modern Orthodox rabbis
Rabbi Jacob Joseph School alumni
The New School alumni
University of Maryland, College Park alumni
Living people
20th-century American rabbis
21st-century American rabbis